Nostalgia For the Future is the first album by American post rock band Constants.  It was released in 2004.

Track listing
"In Medias Res" - 1:17
"Entering Exeter, Pt. 1" - 3:04
"Entering Exeter, Pt. 2" - 5:53
"The Perpetual Morning Subsequent" - 5:04
"A Blur of Trees" - 5:52
"Hypnopædia" - 6:06
"Return to Inevitability" - 4:12
"And the Future of Beginning" - 5:09

Personnel
 Will Benoit - guitar, vocals
 Duncan Rich - drums, samples
 Ben Fowlie - bass, keyboards

Mastered by: UE Nastasi at Sterling Sound

Release Details
 2004, US, Radar Recordings RDR-107, Release Date 2004, CD

External links
 Nostalgia for the Future on Myspace
 Radar Recordings

2004 albums
Constants (band) albums